The Beggar from Cologne Cathedral is a 1927 German silent crime film directed by Rolf Randolf and starring Henry Stuart, Elza Temary and Carl de Vogt. A detective on the trail of a gang of criminals traces them to Cologne.

The film's art direction was by Gustav A. Knauer.

Cast

References

Bibliography

External links

1927 films
Films of the Weimar Republic
Films directed by Rolf Randolf
German silent feature films
1927 crime films
German black-and-white films
German crime films
Films set in Cologne
1920s German films
1920s German-language films